The Saga of Erik the Viking is a children's novel written by the Welsh comedian Terry Jones, illustrated by Michael Foreman, and published by Pavilion in 1983. Foreman was commended for the annual Greenaway Medal by the Library Association, recognising the year's best-illustrated children's book by a British subject.

According to one library record, "A Viking warrior who lived hundreds of years ago sets sail with his men on the Golden Dragon [ship] to find the land where the sun goes at night."

Adaptations

The book was loosely adapted and directed by Jones as a 1989 film Erik the Viking. The film inspired a comic book adaptation by Graham Thompson too.

An officially licensed computer adventure game with the same name was written by Level 9 Computing and released by Mosaic Publishing in 1984. It also featured a completely different plot.

Notes

References

External links

Erik the Viking at Puffin Books

British children's novels
1983 British novels
Novels set in the Viking Age
Books by Terry Jones
British novels adapted into films
Novels adapted into video games
Novels adapted into comics
1983 children's books